The 1890 South Australian Football Association season was the 14th season of the top-level Australian rules football competition in South Australia.

The Gawler Football Club withdrew at the end of the season and formed its own local competition, the predecessor of the current Barossa Light and Gawler Football Association.

Premiership Matches

Round 1

Round 2

Round 3

Round 4

Round 5

Round 6

Round 7

Round 8

Intercolonial Matches 
On the weekends of 5 July and 12 July intercolonial matches were held and SAFA premiership matches suspended.

Round 9

Round 10

Round 11

Round 12

Round 13

Round 14

Round 15 

(Due to the Adelaide Players going to watch the Match at the Oval)

Round 16

Round 17

Round 18

Round 19

Ladder

References 

SANFL
South Australian National Football League seasons